Tikjda is a ski resort located in a mountain range named Djurdjura, northern Algeria, with an altitude of 1,600 metres (5,250 feet), in the province of Bouïra.

In the summers, Tikjda offers walks, rock climbing and many short excursions, with places like Point de vue du Djurdjura and Gouffre de l'Akouker.  The area around Tikjda has many peaks and hillsides covered with cedar forests.

The Mediterranean Sea can be spotted on clear days.

Sources

External links 

 Tikjda: Winter sports
 After years of fear, Algeria's skiers return - RedOrbit

Ski areas and resorts in Algeria
Resorts in Algeria